Sonnets from the Portuguese, written ca. 1845–1846 and published first in 1850, is a collection of 44 love sonnets written by Elizabeth Barrett Browning. The collection was acclaimed and popular during the poet's lifetime and it remains so. Despite what the title implies, the sonnets are entirely Browning's own, and not translated from Portuguese.

Title
Barrett Browning was initially hesitant to publish the poems, believing they were too personal. However, her husband Robert Browning insisted they were the best sequence of English-language sonnets since Shakespeare's time and urged her to publish them. To offer the couple some privacy, she decided to publish them as if they were translations of foreign sonnets. She initially planned to title the collection "Sonnets translated from the Bosnian", but Browning proposed that she claim their source was Portuguese, probably because of her admiration for Camões and Robert's nickname for her: "my little Portuguese". The title is also a reference to Les Lettres Portugaises (1669).

Numbers 33 and 43
The most famous poems from this collection are numbers 33 and 43:

Number 33

Number 43

See also
Thomas James Wise, who authenticated a forged edition.

References

External links

 

Elizabeth Barrett Browning profile and sonnets at Poets.org
Reely's Poetry Pages Hear Sonnets 43 and 33
A Different Slant of Light: The Art and Life of Adelaide Hanscom Leeson: The Sonnets from the Portuguese by Elizabeth Barrett Browning, a photo-illustration of The Sonnets from the Portuguese, includes select photo-illustrations.

British poems
Sonnets
1850 poems
Poetry by Elizabeth Barrett Browning
English poetry collections
Love poems